Molipteryx is a genus of the squash bugs  belonging to the family Coreidae.

Species
 Molipteryx asahinai Kikuhara, 2006
 Molipteryx chinai (Miller, N. C. E., 1931)
 Molipteryx fuliginosa (Uhler, 1860)
 Molipteryx hardwickii (White, 1839)
 Molipteryx lunata (Distant, 1900)

References

Mictini
Coreidae genera